James Needham (1849–1913) was an English mycologist and iron moulder from Hebden Bridge, Yorkshire. He was introduced to fungi by Charles Crossland. He was a founding member of the British Mycological Society. Notable for his working-class status, Needham became one of the foremost collectors of fungi and bryophytes in the UK.

He was instrumental, along with Henry Thomas Soppitt, in the discovery of a heteroecious lifecycle in a Puccinia species. He was also amongst the first proponents of plant and fungal ecology in Great Britain.

His collections and archives are dispersed across the UK including Leeds Museum and Tolson Museum.

References

External link

1849 births
1913 deaths
British mycologists
People from Hebden Bridge
British Mycological Society
19th-century British botanists
20th-century British botanists
English botanists
Members of the Yorkshire Naturalists' Union